The River Ouse is a river in North Yorkshire, England. The length of the Ouse alone is about  but the total length of the river is disputed.

It is a matter of opinion as to whether the River Ouse is formed at the confluence of the River Ure and the much-smaller Ouse Gill Beck at Cuddy Shaw Reach near Linton-on-Ouse, about six miles downstream of the confluence of the River Swale with the River Ure. An alternative opinion is recorded in a publication published in The Yorkshire Post in a series dated 1891, written and illustrated by Tom Bradley. His description and bird's-eye-view maps—specifically in his account of the River Swale—suggests that the River Ouse starts at the confluence of the Swale and the Ure. His narrative states that the Ouse has no specific source, simply flowing from the stated confluence until it runs into the Humber at the confluence of the Ouse and Trent.

Continuing the path of the Ouse downstream from Linton-on-Ouse, it then flows through the city of York and the nearby towns of Selby and Goole before joining with the River Trent at Trent Falls, near the village of Faxfleet, then entering the Humber estuary.

The Ouse's system of tributaries includes the Derwent, Aire, Don, Wharfe, Rother, Nidd, Swale, Ure and Foss. Together they drain a large part of the Pennines, and much of the Yorkshire Dales and North York Moors.

The Ouse valley is a wide, flat plain; heavy rainfall higher in the river's drainage basin can bring severe flooding to settlements. In recent years York, Selby and villages in between have been flooded.

Sources 

The traditional source of the Ouse is in the village of Great Ouseburn, and is marked by a stone column reading "OUSE RIVER HEAD... OUSEGILL SPRING Ft. YORK 13 miles BOROUGHBRIDGE 4 miles".

Etymology
The name was first recorded in about 780 as Usa. It has been speculated that the name is of Romano-Britonic (celtic) origin, from an assumed word udso-, assumed to be derived from the Indo-European root wed-, meaning "water". Alternatively, 'Isaf' and 'Ychaf' are common form of place names in modern Welsh (Romano Britonic's successor) meaning 'upper' and 'lower'. The letter 'U' forms an 'I' sound in Welsh. Other sources prefer a Proto-Celtic origin.

It has been suggested that the Ouse was once known as the 'Ure', but there seems to be no supporting evidence for this claim. The suggestion that the name derives from the Romano-British name of the Ure, assumed to be Isurā from the Roman name for Aldborough, and over time evolved into Isis and finally the Saxon Ouse, would go some way to explaining how the little tributary Ouse Gill Beck usurps the name of the much larger River Ure. However the form Ouse is little changed from the eighth century.

The York district was settled by Norwegian and Danish people, so parts of the place names could be old Norse. Referring to the etymological dictionary "Etymologisk ordbog",  dealing with the common Danish and Norwegian languages—roots of words and the original meaning: Os—the mouth of a river. The old Norse wording oss, gradation form ouso.

Navigation 
The Ouse is navigable throughout its length. Seagoing vessels use the river as far as Howdendyke. The inland port of Goole also accepts seagoing vessels on a regular basis. Goole also offers access to the Aire and Calder Navigation. At Selby there is access to the Selby Canal. The river is tidal up to Naburn; the resultant tidal bore is known locally as "the Aegir".

At Naburn there is a weir with locks, so that boats of  length and  beam can reach York. Above York there is another weir with locks at Linton-on-Ouse, which allows boats of  length to proceed to the River Ure Navigation. Adjacent to the lock is Linton Lock Hydro plant. This is capable of generating enough electricity to power 450 homes.

The navigation authority is Associated British Ports from Trent Falls to Goole railway swing bridge at Skelton, and the Canal & River Trust upstream from there.

In the 18th and 19th centuries, there was considerable commercial traffic on the river, mainly from Selby, which then had a custom house, downstream. After the 1826 opening of the Aire and Calder Navigation, most traffic became concentrated on the port of Goole. This continues, although the coal trade which formed the backbone of the river trade has ceased.

Settlements
(From the confluence of Swale and Ure)

Lower Dunsforth
Aldwark
Linton-on-Ouse
Newton-on-Ouse
Nun Monkton
Beningbrough
Overton
Nether Poppleton
York
South Bank
Fulford
Bishopthorpe
Naburn
Acaster Malbis
Acaster Selby
Cawood
Kelfield
Riccall
Barlby
Selby
Hemingbrough
Barmby on the Marsh
Booth
Hook
Skelton
Goole
Swinefleet
Saltmarshe
Reedness
Little Reedness
Yokefleet
Whitgift
Blacktoft
Ousefleet
Faxfleet

''(Joins Trent at Trent Falls to form Humber)

Flooding
With both the Ouse and the Foss running through York, flooding has been a problem throughout its documented history. Flooding is known to have occurred in 1263, 1316, 1564, 1625, 1638, 1947, 1978, 1982, 2000, 2007, 2010 and 2015. A barrier was installed on the mouth of the River Foss in York city centre in 1989, so that when the Ouse was in flood, water would not run upstream of the Foss and flood the city.

Low-lying land around the villages of Kelfield, Riccall, Wistow and Cawood, which are south of York, are designated as a floodplain, though it can cause damage to properties there.

As the Ouse is tidal as far inland as Naburn, this means that flooding can occur due to heavy rainwater or tidal surges in the downstream settlements of Selby and Goole.

Gallery

See also

Blacktoft Sands RSPB reserve
Bridges over the Ouse
Rivers of the United Kingdom
York City Rowing Club

References

Sources

External links

 
River navigations in the United Kingdom
Rivers of North Yorkshire
Rivers of the East Riding of Yorkshire
 
River Ouse